Paramys is an extinct genus of rodents from North America, Europe, and Asia.  It is one of the oldest genera of rodents known and probably lived in trees. While the genus name literally means "near a mouse", it coexisted with Thisbemys, a similar rodent, thus yielding a reference to Pyramus and Thisbe.

References

Further reading
 Matthew, W. D. 1910. On the osteology and relationships of Paramys and the affinities of the Ischyromyidae. Bulletin of the American Museum of Natural History, 28:43–72.
 Kenneth D. Rose, 2006. The Beginning of the Age of Mammals. The Johns Hopkins University Press. Baltimore MD. pp. 306–335
 Kenneth D. Rose and Brenda J. Chinnery. The Postcranial Skeleton of Early Eocene Rodents. Bulletin of Carnegie Museum of Natural History. Volume 36, Issue 1 (December 2004): pp. 211–244
 Tullberg, T. 1899. Ueber das System der Nagethiere. Eine Phylogenetische Studie. Nova Acta Regiae Soc. Scient Upsala, ser. 3, vol. 18: v + 514 pp., 57 pls
 Wodd A. E. 1962. The Early Tertiary rodents of the family Paramyidae. Transactions of the American Philosophical Society. new series 52(1): 1–261.

Cenozoic mammals of North America
Prehistoric rodent genera
Paleocene rodents
Eocene rodents
Cenozoic mammals of Europe
Cenozoic mammals of Asia